Gonzalo Escalante (born 27 March 1993) is an Argentine professional footballer who plays as a midfielder for Spanish La Liga club Cádiz, on loan from Lazio.

Club career

Early career
Born in Bella Vista, Buenos Aires, Escalante finished his formation with Boca Juniors. He made his professional debut on 13 April 2013, coming on as a half-time substitute for Clemente Rodríguez in a 1–6 away loss against San Martín de San Juan for the Primera División championship.

On 28 August 2014, Escalante was loaned to Italian Serie B side Calcio Catania, in a season-long deal with a buyout clause. He scored his first professional goal on 28 October, netting the first in a 5–1 home routing of Virtus Entella.

On 29 January 2015, Escalante was bought outright by the Sicilians. He appeared in 26 matches and scored one goal during the campaign, as his side finished only 16th.

Eibar
On 16 July 2015, Escalante moved to La Liga side SD Eibar on loan for one year. He made his debut in the category on 24 August, starting and scoring the second in a 3–1 away win against Granada CF.

On 11 January 2016, Escalante joined the Armeros permanently, signing a contract until 2020.

Lazio
On 13 January 2020, Escalante reached an agreement with Lazio to join the club ahead of the 2020–21 season, penning a four-year contract.

Loan to Alavés
On 4 January 2022, Escalante returned to Spain and its top tier after agreeing to a loan deal with Deportivo Alavés.

Loan to Cremonese
On 9 August 2022, Escalante was loaned to Cremonese, with an option to buy.

Loan to Cádiz
On 25 January 2023, Escalante once again moved to Spain, joining Cádiz on loan.

Career statistics

Club

References

External links

1993 births
Living people
Footballers from Buenos Aires
Argentine footballers
Association football midfielders
Argentine Primera División players
Boca Juniors footballers
Serie A players
Serie B players
Catania S.S.D. players
La Liga players
SD Eibar footballers
S.S. Lazio players
Deportivo Alavés players
U.S. Cremonese players
Cádiz CF players
Argentine expatriate footballers
Argentine expatriate sportspeople in Italy
Argentine expatriate sportspeople in Spain
Expatriate footballers in Italy
Expatriate footballers in Spain